Two Thousand Maniacs! is a 1964 American horror film written and directed by Herschell Gordon Lewis and starring 1963 Playboy Playmate Connie Mason. It follows a group of Northern tourists who are savagely tortured and murdered during a Confederate celebration of a small Southern community's centennial.

The film has been noted by critics as an early example of hicksploitation in grindhouse films, as well as for its sensationalizing of national perceptions between the North and South. The film was remade in 2005 as 2001 Maniacs. The story of the film was inspired by the 1947 Lerner and Loewe musical Brigadoon.

Plot 
In 1965, two local rednecks named Rufus and Lester use detour signs to lure six young tourists into their rural town of Pleasant Valley, Georgia. Upon their arrival, they are warmly welcomed by the townsfolk, and are introduced to some of them, including Rufus, Lester, and town mayor Earl Buckman. The tourists are invited to be "guests of honour" for their centennial celebration being held over the weekend. The mayor promises to provide the tourists complimentary hotel rooms, free food and entertainment throughout the celebration, and the visitors decide to go along with it.

That night, whilst one of the tourists, Bea Miller, is alone in her hotel room, she gets a call from Harper, who invites her to take a walk with him. She accepts the invitation and he leads her into the woods nearby, where he suddenly takes out a knife and uses it to slice off her right thumb. Harper then takes a hysterical Bea to Buckman's office where she is accosted by Buckman, Rufus, and Lester. As the other three hold her down on a table, Rufus chops off her right arm with an axe, killing her.

Meanwhile, two other tourists, Tom White and his girlfriend Terry Adams, begin growing suspicions about the strange goings on in town. Terry's suspicions grow during a barbecue later that night, where, unbeknownst to the tourists, Bea's arm is slowly being spit-roasted. Soon after, Tom quietly draws Terry away to a plaque he found in the woods, which states that a group of renegade Union soldiers massacred much of the Pleasant Valley townsfolk near the end of the Civil War in 1865. They realize that this "centennial" is really an act of revenge for the destruction of the town one hundred years ago, and that they and the other tourists are the intended victims. Mayor Buckman, Rufus, and Lester spot the two from a distance and run after them, but Terry and Tom manage to escape.

Meanwhile, back at the festivities, one local, Betsy, gets Bea's husband John drunk on moonshine whilst the two other tourists, David and Beverly Wells, secretly watch from across the barbecue pit. After Besty's boyfriend Harper escorts the couple back to the hotel, the townspeople surround John and tie both his arms and legs to four horses that are sent running in different directions, dismembering him. 

The next morning, Betsy takes David to a gathering on a hill near the lake. Rufus and another man force David into a barrel, which Mayor Buckman hammers nails into before rolling it down the hill, killing David. Meanwhile, Tom and Terry attemp to sneak out of the hotel, but Harper sees them and gives chase. They run through a nearby swamp, where Harper get stuck in a pool of quicksand and apparently sinks to his death. Meanwhile, Lester brings Beverly to the town square to be the judge for the next event; a dunk tank-esque attraction, but one which has a boulder instead of a water tank. Beverly is forcibly tied down to the platform and the crowd take turns throwing rocks at the target, before Lester eventually manages to hit the target, releasing the boulder and causing it to crush Beverly to death while the crowd celebrates.

Elswhere, Tom and Terry manage to locate their car and escape the town. They make it to the nearest police station and tell the sheriff about what happened, but the sheriff is skeptical. Back in Pleasant Valley, Mayor Buckman deems the centennial a success, and declares the celebration over.

Tom and Terry return to Pleasant Valley with the police chief, only to find that the town has mysteriously vanished. The chief remains skeptic about their story, but then recalls a local rumour, which claims that the vengeful spirits of those killed in the 1865 massacre still haunt the area where the town once stood. The film ends with the ghosts of Rufus, Lester and Harper heading towards the woods and disappearing, whilst looking forward to the next centennial to be hosted 2065.

Cast 
 Connie Mason as Terry Adams
 Shelby Livingston as Bea Miller
 William Kerwin as Tom White (credited as "Thomas Wood")
 Jeffrey Allen as Mayor Buckman
 Gary Bakeman as Rufus Tate
 Ben Moore as Lester MacDonald
 Jerome Eden as John Miller
 Stanley Dyrector as Harper Alexander (credited as "Mark Douglas")
 Linda Cochran as Betsy
 Michael Korb as David Wells
 Yvonne Gilbert as Beverly Wells
 Vincent Santo as Billy

Production 
Two Thousand Maniacs! was filmed in 15 days, early in 1964, in the town of St. Cloud, Florida. According to a contemporary report, the entire town participated in the film.

The film was the feature film debut of a nonprofessional Illinois stage actor named Taalkeus Blank (1910-1991; nicknamed "Talky" his entire life) who played Pleasant Valley Mayor Buckman. He used the pseudonym "Jeffery Allen" in all of his film appearances because he was never a member of the Screen Actors Guild. Director Lewis was so impressed by Blank's ability to perfectly mimic any type of Southern accent that he hired Blank to appear in many of his later films, among them Moonshine Mountain (1964), This Stuff'll Kill Ya! (1971) and Year of the Yahoo! (1972), playing various Southern-accented characters under the Jeffrey Allen pseudonym.

The film's budget was considerably larger than what the filmmakers had previously had to work with, and afforded the film a more polished production.

Release
Two Thousand Maniacs! was heavily cut by the MPAA before its release, which resulted in the film being scantily screened across the country. The film mostly played at drive-in theaters, especially in the Southern United States, where it did considerably well. Among its earliest releases was on October 1, 1964 in Denver, Colorado.

Critical reception

On review aggregator Rotten Tomatoes, Two Thousand Maniacs! holds an approval rating of 41%, based on 22 reviews, and an average rating of 4.33/10. Its consensus reads, "It didn't take much to thrill early splatter fans, and Two Thousand Maniacs! proves it with its shrill soundtrack, basement-level theatrics, and goofy flesh-tearing gore."

Allmovie wrote, "drive-in gore king Herschell Gordon Lewis reached a creative peak with this darkly comic slaughterfest". In a retrospective, Marjorie Baumgarten of the Austin Chronicle called the film "remarkably durable" and referred to it as "one of the sickest movies ever made."

Critical analysis
Two Thousand Maniacs! was one of the early films to introduce audiences to the formulaic plot of Southern gore films: Northern outsiders who are stranded in the rural South are horrifically murdered by virulent, backwoods Southerners. This subgenre of grindhouse peaked with the release of Tobe Hooper's The Texas Chain Saw Massacre (1974), and Two Thousand Maniacs! has been credited as being influential on Hooper's film.

During the Civil Rights Movement in the United States, television and mainstream narrative films used the "rednecks" caricature rather than a realistic depiction of white Southerners like the televised news of the era. However, Lewis' plotline in Two Thousand Maniacs! focused on the ghosts of a violent, vengeful Confederacy, and acknowledged the region's violent history and place in the anxiety of the rest of the United States. The film has been noted by scholars as sensationalizing historical anxieties that the rest of the nation held toward the South's history (and that of its white inhabitants) of extra-legal violence, perceived primitivism, and unresolved regional conflict.

In his essay "Remapping Southern Hospitality", Anthony Szczesiul explained the film's use of Southern hospitality and other Southern stereotypes: "The film's ironic parody of southern hospitality highlights the performative nature of the discourse. When Mayor Buckman delivers his promise of southern hospitality in his thick, cartoonish accent, the reference is immediately recognizable to all–the characters in the film, its actors and director, its original audience, and by us today–but here the possibility of southern hospitality is transformed into a cruel joke: the visitor becomes victim.

Legacy
"An all-time great because of all the sadism", enthused Cramps singer and horror aficionado Lux Interior. "The people who act in the movie actually live in the town where it was filmed—they look very inbred. There's a wonderful scene where they take this sexy girl and drop this 2,000lb. rock on her from 20 feet, and the whole town's out there watching. Old ladies all looking, like, 'What are we doing here?'"

In popular culture
The 1980s alternative rock band 10,000 Maniacs took their name in homage to the film as a way of making them stand out from other bands on the college rock scene.
The John Waters film Multiple Maniacs is named in homage to the film, as well.

See also
List of American films of 1964
List of ghost films

References

Notes

External links 

 
 
 

1964 horror films
1964 films
American Civil War films
American films about revenge
Films directed by Herschell Gordon Lewis
Films set in Florida
Films shot in Florida
Films set in 1965
American ghost films
Southern Gothic films
American splatter films
American exploitation films
1960s exploitation films
1960s English-language films
1960s American films